Ashraf Hossain (died 18 July 2020) was a Bangladesh Nationalist Party politician who served as member of parliament of Khulna-3.

Career
Hossain was elected to parliament from Khulna-3 as a Bangladesh Nationalist Party candidate in 1991 and 2001. He served as the whip in the Parliament.

Death 
Hossain died on 18 July 2020 in United Hospital, Dhaka, Bangladesh.

References

Bangladesh Nationalist Party politicians
2020 deaths
5th Jatiya Sangsad members
8th Jatiya Sangsad members
People from Khulna District
6th Jatiya Sangsad members
2nd Jatiya Sangsad members
Year of birth missing